Jacques-Cartier County was an historic county on the Island of Montreal in the province of Quebec. It existed between
1855
and 1970.

References

External links
NGA GEOnet Names Server (GNS), 18TWR9114839158, http://geonames.nga.mil/ggmagaz/

Geography of Montreal
Former counties of Quebec
Populated places disestablished in 1970